A constitutional referendum was held in Chad on 6 June 2005. The amendments to the constitution were approved by 66% of voters.

Background
The proposed amendments to the constitution included the removal of two-term limit on the President, the replacement of the Senate with a Cultural, Economic and Social Council and giving the President powers to amend the constitution.

The amendments were proposed by incumbent President Idriss Déby, who was due to complete his second term in 2006. In June 2001 Déby had promised to step down after his second term, stating: I make a public commitment: I will not be candidate at the 2006 presidential election. I will not change the Constitution [...] What remains to do for me in my last mandate, is to prepare Chad for alternation in government.

Campaign
While Dèby's Patriotic Salvation Movement (MPS) campaigned for "yes", the opposition was divided among those who called for a boycott of the vote and those who called for a "no" vote. The abstentionists allied themselves in the Coordination des Partis politiques pour la Défense de la Constitution (CPDC), an alliance of 24 parties including the Rally for Democracy and Progress and the Union for Renewal and Democracy. The parties that campaigned for a "no" vote included  the Front of Action Forces for the Republic and the Rally for the Republic – Lingui.

Results

By region

Aftermath
The constitutional amendment allowed Déby to contest the 2006 presidential elections, in which he won a third term.

References

2005 referendums
2005 in Chad
2005
Constitutional referendums
June 2005 events in Africa